Saland in Luri Language Sâland ; formerly, Sardasht (Persian: سر دشت) also Romanized as Sar Dasht and Sar-ī-Dasht) is a city and capital of Sardasht District, in Dezful County, Khuzestan Province, Iran.  At the 2006 census, its population was 1,841, in 394 families.

References

Populated places in Dezful County

Cities in Khuzestan Province